Taraxacum desertorum is a species of flowering plant in the family Asteraceae. It is called the desert dandelion.
This species can be found in Azerbaijan and throughout the Caucasus.

Status 
The Taraxacum desertorum is listed as least concern by the IUCN.

References

desertorum
Flora of the Caucasus